"Mañana" is the third single of Álvaro Soler and Cali y El Dandee from Álvaro Soler album Magia after the title track "Magia" and "Si te vas". The single was released on 2 July 2021. Written by Alexander Zuckowski, Simon Triebel, David Jürgens, Mauricio Rengifo, Alejandro Rengifo, Nico Wellenbrink and the singer himself Alvaro Tauchert Soler, it charted in a number of European charts.

Track listing
"Mañana" - Álvaro Soler & Cali y El Dandee - 3:32	
"Alma de luz" - Alvaro Soler - 2:35

Charts

Weekly charts

Year-end charts

References

2021 songs
Álvaro Soler songs